The Delaware River (Texas) or Delaware Creek is an intermittent stream that rises in Guadalupe Mountains National Park about  west of Pine Springs and  north of Guadalupe Peak in northwestern Culberson County, Texas.

From its source in the sky island of Guadalupe Mountains National Park, the Delaware River flows through the sparsely populated Chihuahuan Desert.  There are no cities or towns along its course, and a few ranches and the small community of Pine Springs (population 51) are the only settlements.  The land near the river is mostly used for cattle ranching.

The Delaware River was named after the Delaware Indians who guided early American expeditions to this area, including that of Randolph B. Marcy in 1849. The Butterfield Stage route, beginning in 1858, followed the Delaware River. A stagecoach station was established at Delaware Springs where several springs, some with potable water and others mineralized, provided the only reliable source of water for many miles around.

See also
List of rivers of Texas

Notes

References

USGS Geographic Names Information Service
USGS Hydrologic Unit Map - State of Texas (1974)

Rivers of Texas
Bodies of water of Culberson County, Texas